is a 1927 black and white Japanese silent film with benshi accompaniment directed by Sentaro Shirai. This is a significant and rare film in that it depicts the tragic fate of a Christian lord who fought for his faith in the Edo period. Especially noteworthy are the final scenes in which Utaemon Ichikawa takes on his enemy with a gash in his forehead and wild, unkempt hair.

External links
Dokuro on Internet Movie Database

1927 films
Japanese silent films
Japanese black-and-white films